Arthur Elliot Crump (November 29, 1901 – September 26, 1976) was a Major League Baseball center fielder who played in one game for the New York Giants in .

External links

New York Giants (NL) players
1901 births
1976 deaths
Baseball players from Norfolk, Virginia
Greeneville Burley Cubs players